Francisco Javier Bosma Mínguez (born 6 November 1969 in Roses, Girona) is a former Spanish beach volleyball player, who won the silver medal in the men's beach volleyball tournament at the 2004 Summer Olympics in Athens together with Pablo Herrera.

Javier Bosma started playing beach volleyball in 1994 and also competed at the 1996 Summer Olympics and the 2000 Summer Olympics, finishing 5th both times. He had surgery on his right leg six times and retired at the end of 2006.

References

External links
 

1969 births
Living people
Beach volleyball players from Catalonia
Spanish beach volleyball players
Men's beach volleyball players
Beach volleyball players at the 1996 Summer Olympics
Beach volleyball players at the 2000 Summer Olympics
Beach volleyball players at the 2004 Summer Olympics
Olympic beach volleyball players of Spain
Olympic silver medalists for Spain
Olympic medalists in beach volleyball
Medalists at the 2004 Summer Olympics